Dorsal nerve may refer to:

Dorsal cutaneous nerve
Dorsal digital nerves
Dorsal digital nerves of foot
Dorsal scapular nerve
Dorsal nerve cord
Dorsal nerve of clitoris
Dorsal nerve of the penis
Intermediate dorsal cutaneous nerve
Lateral dorsal cutaneous nerve
Medial dorsal cutaneous nerve